Austin is an unincorporated community, considered a ghost town, in Grant County, Oregon, United States. It is located north of Oregon Route 7, near the Middle Fork John Day River in the Malheur National Forest.

History
Austin was named for Minot and Linda Austin, early settlers of the area. The Austins operated a small store and hotel, Austin House. Austin House was started as a hotel and stagecoach station by a Mr. Newton. Austin post office was established in 1888 and closed in 1950.

The tracks of the Sumpter Valley Railway reached Austin in 1905. The railway was built by Oregon Lumber Company and Austin became an important railroad logging community.
Austin was the hub of the area until Bates, a company town of the Oregon Lumber Company, was built  to the west. Austin was also a supply depot for local mining towns, including Susanville and Galena. Austin sawmills supplied lumber for places such as Greenhorn and the Bonanza Mine, higher up in the Blue Mountains. At its height, the population was about 500 (some estimates say it was high as 5,000) and the community had three sawmills. The town also had a substantial jail and the offices of several doctors, lawyers and real estate operators. As the neighboring mining towns disappeared, however, Austin also went into decline.

By 1997, a newer business called Austin House was the only business remaining in the Austin area, at Austin Junction where Oregon Route 7 meets U.S. Route 26. As of 2002, fewer than 35 people lived within a  radius of Austin.

See also
List of ghost towns in Oregon

References

External links

Historic image of Austin from the Oregon State Library
Modern image of Austin House from the Oregon Scenic Images for Grant County from Oregon State Archives
Images of Austin from ghosttowns.com
History of Austin and Bates from Austin House Cafe & Country Store
Grant County, Oregon biographies from oregongenealogy.com, including biography of Minot Austin

Ghost towns in Oregon
Unincorporated communities in Grant County, Oregon
1888 establishments in Oregon
Populated places established in 1888
Unincorporated communities in Oregon